Nanjing World Trade Center Tower 1 is a supertall skyscraper under construction in Nanjing, Jiangsu, China. Construction started in 2011 and is expected to be completed in 2022.

See also
List of tallest buildings in China

References

 Skyscraper office buildings in Nanjing
 Buildings and structures under construction in China
 Skyscraper hotels in Nanjing
 Skyscrapers in Nanjing